The 2008–09 Slovenian PrvaLiga was the 18th season of top-tier football league in Slovenia. The competition was officially called PrvaLiga Telekom Slovenije for sponsorship reasons. The season started on 19 July 2008 and ended on 23 May 2009.

Clubs

Promotion and relegation
In the previous season, Livar were relegated to the Slovenian Second League after just one year in the top division, finishing last with only 17 points. Drava Ptuj successfully avoided relegation by beating Bonifika in the relegation play-offs.

Promoted to Slovenia's top football league were Second League champions Rudar Velenje, returning to PrvaLiga after a two-year absence.

League table

Relegation play-offs
The ninth-placed team of PrvaLiga played a two-legged relegation play-off against the runners-up of the 2008–09 Slovenian Second League, played on 31 May and 7 June 2009. Drava won 9–3 on aggregate and thereby secured a spot in the 2009–10 Slovenian PrvaLiga.

Drava won 9–3 on aggregate.

Results
Every team played four times against their opponents, twice at home and twice on the road, for a total of 36 matches.

First half of the season

Second half of the season

Top goalscorers

Source: PrvaLiga.si

See also
2008 Slovenian Supercup
2008–09 Slovenian Football Cup
2008–09 Slovenian Second League

References
General

Specific

External links
Official website of the PrvaLiga 

Slovenian PrvaLiga seasons
Slovenia
1